The Nairobi airport fire occurred when, on 7 August 2013, a fire broke out inside the main terminal building at Jomo Kenyatta International Airport in Nairobi, Kenya, destroying two of the three units contained in the building. No one was killed, but two people were hospitalized with non-life-threatening injuries. Incoming flights were diverted to Uganda, Tanzania, and other airports in Kenya.

The fire

At approximately 4:30 am local time, a fire originating in the immigration section of Unit I (used for international departures) rapidly spread to adjoining Unit II, which is used for international arrivals. The construction of the building (it was completed in 1978), a roof collapse in Unit I, and heavy traffic in the area hindered initial efforts to extinguish the blaze. Initial media reports showed some firefighters using buckets to fight the fire. Several groups, including the Kenya Army and firefighters from private companies, assisted in fighting the fire. After six hours, on-scene officials indicated that the fire had been contained.

After the fire had been extinguished, businesses affected by the fire reported that items were missing from their businesses. Various reports indicated that first responders had looted fire-damaged businesses during and after the fire, leading some to believe that the fire could have been put out sooner had all the firefighters kept their focus on extinguishing the blaze. Tourists who were displaced by the fire also reported that they were assaulted by thugs who blocked access to the main gate, where the tourists were attempting to retrieve their belongings.

Victims
A spokesman for Kenya Airways, the primary tenant at the airport, indicated that two of its employees had been transported to a local hospital for observation. One of the individuals was treated for smoke inhalation. There were no immediate reports of injuries to firefighting personnel or other airport employees.

Investigation

After the fire was extinguished, a preliminary investigation was started. Possible terrorism was an initial concern because the fire occurred on the fifteenth anniversary of the terrorist bombings of United States embassies in Kenya and Tanzania plus the fact that Kenya has been involved in an armed conflict with Al-Shabaab in neighboring Somalia. Investigators, however, soon ruled out terrorism as the cause of the fire. The cause was later confirmed to be an electrical fault in a distribution board.

Aftermath

The international arrival and departure units were completely destroyed in the fire. Airport officials have elected to use Unit III (used for domestic arrivals and departures) to handle some international traffic. Operations were partly reestablished on 8 August. A new unit (Unit IV) is under construction and was scheduled to open in August 2013, but the new unit was opened on 1 July 2014 and renamed as Terminal 1A. Unit IV was not damaged in the fire.

See also
Düsseldorf Airport fire, which occurred on  11 April 1996, destroying a major part of the terminal building at Düsseldorf Airport.

References

Airport fires
2013 in Kenya
2013 fires in Africa
Fires in Kenya
History of Nairobi
August 2013 events in Africa
2010s in Nairobi
2013 disasters in Kenya